The 2012 Appalachian State Mountaineers football team represented Appalachian State University in the 2012 NCAA Division I FCS football season. They were led by 24th-year head coach Jerry Moore and played their home games at Kidd Brewer Stadium. They were a member of the Southern Conference. They finished the season 8–4, 6–2 in SoCon play to share the conference championship with Georgia Southern and Wofford. They received an at–large bid to the FCS Playoffs where they lost in the second round to Illinois State in what would turn out to be the school's last postseason game as an FCS program, as the Mountaineers will move to FBS and the Sun Belt Conference in 2014.

Schedule

Source: Schedule

Ranking movements

References

Appalachian State
Appalachian State Mountaineers football seasons
Southern Conference football champion seasons
Appalachian State
Appalachian State Mountaineers football